Arco is a comune in Trentino-Alto Adige in northern Italy.
The town is faced on one side by sheer limestone cliffs jutting up like a wall protecting it and its ancient hilltop castle.
King Francis II of the Two Sicilies died here in 1894.

Main sights
The Castello di Arco, medieval castle
Sanctuary and convent of Santa Maria delle Grazie, built in 1475–1492. It houses a wooden statue of the Virgin Mary dating to the 15th century
Collegiata dell'Assunta, begun in 1613. Francis II, the last King of Two Sicilies, was provisionally buried here in the late 19th century, after his death at Arco in 1894.
Church of Sant'Apollinare, with 14th-century frescoes
Palazzo Marchettii (16th century). It has a portal attributed to Giulio Romano.
Palazzo dei Panni (late 17th century)
Stations of the Cross to the chapel "Santuario della Madonna di Laghel" 1896 by Josef Moroder-Lusenberg

Economy
Tourism is a major part of the local economy, with many Germans and Austrians coming over the Brenner Pass from Austria. 
Popular tourist activities include windsurfing on nearby Lake Garda, and rock climbing on the walls near the city. The annual Rock Master event, an international climbing competition, is held on the town's outdoor artificial wall. Mountain biking is popular and international bikers flock to the town.

Agriculture is also important, with vines and citrus orchards filling the valley opposite the castle. Agro-chemical plants line the river Sarca towards the lake.

Twin towns
 Schotten, Germany, since 1960
 Bogen, Germany, since 1983
 Roccella Ionica, Italy, since 2007
 Maybole, Scotland

Climate

References

External links

 Homepage of the city
Arco tourist information
Falesia.it, free climbing in Italy
gardamove.com
Mountain Guides School Arco
Mountain Guides

Cities and towns in Trentino-Alto Adige/Südtirol
Populated places on Lake Garda
Garda Mountains